The North American Journal of Psychology is a triannual peer-reviewed academic journal that was established in 1999 by Lynn E. McCutcheon, who is currently the editor-in-chief. It covers all areas of psychology, especially personality, social, and developmental psychology. The journal publishes original research articles, literature reviews, qualitative studies, and interviews with notable psychologists. It is abstracted and indexed in PsycINFO and ProQuest.

References

External links 
 

Publications established in 1999
Triannual journals
English-language journals
Psychology journals